Águilas Doradas is a Colombian futsal team based in Rionegro, Colombia that plays in the Liga Argos. The club was founded in January 2011 in Itagüí by the football team Itagüí F.C. and was known as the "Golden Eagles of Itagüí". In 2013, the club was renamed as Talento Dorado, however since 2014 the club have its current name. Águilas Doradas plays in the Coliseo del Cielo. The team had very good results in its first season reaching quarter-finals. In 2012 they became champions of the league.

Managers
 Jaime Cuervo (January 2011 – December 2012)
 David Sánchez (January 2013 – December 2014)
 Henry Gómez (January 2015 – present)

Uniform and team badge
The uniform shirt is gold holder, stockings and black pants. The alternate uniform is completely white. The team badge is gold and black colors.

See also
 Rionegro Águilas

External links
 Official website

Futsal clubs in Colombia
Futsal clubs established in 2011
2011 establishments in Colombia